Guru Pankaj Charan Das (1919-2003) was an Indian classical dancer, choreographer and the Ādi Guru of Odissi dance. He is known as the 'Father of Odissi dance'.

Life

He was the adopted son of a mahari (temple dancer) Ratna Prabha Devi and from her he learnt the art of devotional movement. He was responsible to revive the dance form that later became the base for birth of Odissi. He was the man who was responsible for bringing odissi out of the temple precincts into broad daylight. He was also awardees of Padmashree in 1992.
His dance was laden with bhakti rasa and each of its movements spelt the holy name of Lord Jagannath. He strictly followed the mahari style in his dance. He was especially adept in group choreographies and has left his indelible impression on masterpieces like Glānisanghāra, Matrubandanā, Balagopālashtaka and many more. His expertise dealt with both Odia and Sanskrit language. His choreographed dance episodes based on the lives of great poets of India Kalidas and Jayadeba. In mid-life he was made the head of department of Odissi dance, in Utkal Sangeet Mahavidyalaya, the only college of dance & music of Odisha. He was associated with the college for more than 25 years and later retired as the Principal.

He taught Kelucharan Mohapatra, Deba Prasad Das, Mayadhar Raut, and Bhagaban Sahu.

Awards

 President's Award by Sangeet Natak Academi
 Orissa Sahitya Academi Award
 State Sangeet Natak Academi
 Kabi Samrat Upendra Bhanja Award
 Padmashree by Govt. Of India

References

External links
 ‘guru of all gurus’ in Odissi dance Padma Shri Pankaj Charan Das. 
 Adi guru Pankaj Charan Das ,
 Pankaj Charan Das choreographed Vasmasura as the dance director 
 Padmashree Guru Pankaj Charan Das 
 Odissi Guru Pankaj Charan Das, who belonged to the family of a mahari 

20th-century births
2003 deaths
Recipients of the Padma Shri in arts
Recipients of the Sangeet Natak Akademi Award
Odissi exponents
People from Puri
Dancers from Odisha
20th-century Indian dancers
Indian male dancers